This is a List of National Historic Landmarks in Georgia.  The United States National Historic Landmark program is operated under the auspices of the National Park Service, and recognizes structures, districts, objects, and similar resources according to a list of criteria of national significance.

The state of Georgia is home to 50 of these landmarks, spanning a range of history.

Current NHLs

The current NHLs are distributed across 24 of Georgia's 159 counties.

|}

Historic areas administered by the National Park Service
National Historic Sites, National Historical Parks, National Monuments, and certain other areas listed in the National Park system are historic landmarks of national importance that are highly protected already, often before the inauguration of the NHL program in 1960, and are then often not also named NHLs per se.  There are eight of these in Georgia.  The National Park Service lists these eight together with the NHLs in the state,  The Martin Luther King, Jr. National Historic Site is also an NHL and is listed above.  The remaining seven are:

See also
Historic preservation
National Register of Historic Places listings in Georgia
History of Georgia (U.S. state)

References

External links

National Historic Landmarks Program, at National Park Service

Georgia
 
National Historic Landmarks